Airport North station is a station on Line 11 and Line 20 of the Shenzhen Metro. The station will serve the future Terminal T4 of Shenzhen Bao'an International Airport.

Station layout

Exits

References

Railway stations in Guangdong
Shenzhen Metro stations
Railway stations in China opened in 2016
Airport railway stations in China